Sterk is a Dutch descriptive surname meaning "strong". A variant form is Sterck. The Hungarian surname Sterk and the Slavic surname Šterk may have independent origins. It may refer to:

Claire E. Sterk (born 1957), Dutch anthropologist, provost of Emory University
Jane Sterk (born 1947), Canadian psychologist, businesswoman, academic, and politician
Jim Sterk (born 1956), College athletic director
Károly Sterk (1881–1946), Hungarian chess master
Katalin Sterk (born 1961), Hungarian high jumper
Maria Sterk (born 1979), Dutch marathon speed skater
Marijn Sterk (born 1987), Dutch football defender
Mieke Sterk (born 1946), Dutch pentathlete and Labour Party politician
Mirjam Sterk (born 1973), Dutch politician, civil servant, RTV editor and educator
Rafael Sterk (born 1978), Australian water polo player
Stewart Sterk (born 1952), American legal scholar
Valerie Sterk (born 1975), American volleyball player
 (1880–1944), Hungarian-born Austrian librettist
Yuri Sterk (born 1962), Bulgarian diplomat, Ambassador, Permanent Representative to UN Office in Geneva
Sterck
Joachim Sterck van Ringelbergh (c.1499–c.1531), Flemish humanist, mathematician and astrologer
 (born 1955), Flemish writer
Thomas Sterck (1900–1970), American football player
Stêrk
Nisti Stêrk (born 1977), Swedish-Kurdish actress and comedian
Šterk
Jure Šterk (1937–2009), Slovenian long-distance sailor and author
Vladimir Šterk (1891–1941), Croatian architect

See also
Stark (surname), equivalent German surname
Sterk Door Combinatie Putten, known as SDC Putten, is a football club from Putten, the Netherlands
Door Oefening Sterk or VV DOS, football club from Utrecht, Netherlands
Door Wilskracht Sterk or AFC DWS, a Dutch football club from Amsterdam
Jeanette Sterke (born 1933), Czech-born British actress
Sterkh
Sterkia
Sterksel
Sterky
Sterków

References

Dutch-language surnames